The 1970 Championship of Australia was the 14th edition of the Championship of Australia, an ANFC-organised national club Australian rules football match between the champion clubs from the VFL and the SANFL.

Qualified Teams

Venue
 Adelaide Oval (Capacity: 64,000)

Match Details

Championship of Australia 

Championship of Australia
1970 in Australian rules football
October 1970 sports events in Australia